The following is a list of works by philosopher Graham Priest.

Books

 Priest, Graham; Routley, R. On Paraconsistency Research Report #l3, Research School of Social Sciences, Australian National University 1983. Reprinted as the introductory chapters of Paraconsistent Logic, G.Priest, R. Routley and J. Norman (eds.), Philosophia Verlag, 1989. Translated into Romanian as chapters in I. Lucica (ed.), Ex Falso Quodlibet: studii de logica paraconsistenta (in Romanian), Editura Technica, 2004.
 Priest, Graham. Logic: a Very Short Introduction, Oxford University Press, 2000.  Translated into Portuguese as Lógica para Começar, Temas & Debates, 2002. Translated into Spanish as Una Brevísima Introducción a la Lógica, Oceano, 2006. Translated into Czech, as Logika – průvodce pro každého, Dokořán, 2007. Translated into Persian by Bahram Asadian, 2007. Translated into Japanese, Iwanami Shoten, 2008.
 
 Priest, Graham. Introduction to Non-Classical Logic, Cambridge University Press, 2001. 2nd edition: Introduction to Non-Classical Logic: From If to Is, Cambridge University Press, 2008.  German translation of Part 1 of Introduction to Non-Classical Logic: From If to Is: Einführung in die nicht-klassische Logik, Mentis 2008.
 Priest, Graham. Beyond the Limits of Thought, Cambridge University Press, 1995. 2nd edition, Oxford University Press, 2002. 
 Priest, Graham. Towards Non-Being: the Semantics and Metaphysics of Intentionality, Oxford University Press, 2005. 
 Priest, Graham. In Contradiction: A Study of the Transconsistent, Martinus Nijhoff, 1987. Second edition Oxford University Press, 2006. 
 Priest, Graham. Doubt Truth to be a Liar, Oxford University Press, 2006. 
 Priest, Graham. Logic: A Brief Insight, Sterling 2010. 
 Priest, Graham. One: Being an Investigation into the Unity of Reality and of its Parts, including the Singular Object which is Nothingness, Oxford University Press, 2014. 
 Priest, Graham. 2018. The Fifth Corner of Four: An Essay on Buddhist Metaphysics and the Catuṣkoṭi. Oxford: Oxford University Press. 
 Deguchi, Yasuo, Jay L. Garfield, Graham Priest, and Robert H. Sharf. 2021. What Can’t Be Said: Paradox and Contradiction in East Asian Thought. New York: Oxford University Press. 
 Priest, Graham. 2021. Capitalism—Its Nature and Its Replacement: Buddhist and Marxist Insights. Routledge.

Articles

 Translated into French as 'La Logique du Paradoxe', Philosophie 94 (2007), 72–94.

 translated into Bulgarian and reprinted in Filosofska Missal XL(8), 1984, 63–76.

 Reprinted as ch. 8 of D. Jacquette (ed.) Philosophy of Mathematics, Blackwell, 2002.

 'Unstable Solutions to the Liar Paradox' in Self Reference: Reflections and Reflexivity, S.J. Bartlett and P. Suber (eds.), Nijhoff, 1987.

 'Reasoning about Truth', Technical Report TR-ARP-2/88, Automated Reasoning Project, Australian National University, 1988.
 'Consistency by Default', Technical Report TR-ARP-3/88, Automated Reasoning Project, Australian National University, 1988.

 'Classical  Logic Aufgehogen'  in  Paraconsistent  Logic,  G.  Priest,  R.  Routley  and   J. Norman (eds.), Philosophia Verlag, 1989.
 'Reductio ad Absurdum et Modus Tollendo Ponens' in Paraconsistent Logic,  G. Priest,  R. Routley and J. Norman (eds.),  Philosophia Verlag, 1989.  Reprinted in Rumanian in I. Lucica (ed.), Ex Falso Quodlibet: studii de logica paraconsistenta (in Romanian), Editura Technica, 2004.
 'Relevance,  Truth and Meaning' (with J. Crosthwaite) in Directions of Relevant Logic, R. Sylvan and J. Norman (eds.), Nijhoff, 1989.

 'Goedel's Theorem and Creativity', in Creativity, ed. T Dartnall, Kluwer Academic Publishers, 1994. Reprinted with a different introduction as 'Goedel's Theorem and the Mind... Again', in Philosophy of Mind: the place of philosophy in the study of  mind,  eds. M.Michaelis and J. O'Leary-Horthorne, Kluwer, 1994.

 'Some Priorities of Berkeley', Logic and Reality: Essays on the Legacy of  Arthur  Prior, ed. B.J.Copeland, Oxford University Press, 1996.

  Reprinted in G. Lee Bowie and Meredith Michaels (eds.), 13 Questions in Ethics and Social Philosophy, Harcourt, Brace, Jovanovich, 2nd ed., 1997.
 'Paraconsistent Logic', Encyclopaedia of Mathematics; Supplement, ed. M. Hazenwinkle, Kluwer Academic Publishers, 1997, 400–1.
 'Logic, Nonstandard', pp. 307–10, Encyclopedia of Philosophy; Supplement, ed. D.Borshert, MacMillan, 1996.
 Paraconsistent Logic'  (with K.Tanaka), Stanford Internet Encyclopedia of Philosophy, created 1996.

  Translated into Croatian, ch. 9 of I. Primoratz (ed.), Suvremena filozofija seksualnosti, Zagreb: KruZak, 2003.

 'Language, its Possibility, and Ineffability', pp. 790–794 of P. Wiengartner, G.Schurz and G.Dorn (eds.), Proceedings of the 20th International Wittgenstein Symposium, The Austrian Ludwig Wittgenstein Society, 1997.

 'Paraconsistent Logic', Encyclopedia of Philosophy, Vol.7, 208–11, ed. E.Craig, Routledge, 1998.

 'Number', Encyclopedia of Philosophy, Vol.7, 47–54, ed. E.Craig, Routledge, 1998.

 'Dialetheism', Stanford Internet Encyclopedia of Philosophy, created 1998. 
 'What not? A Defence of a Dialetheic Account of Negation', in D.Gabbay and H.Wansing (eds.), What is Negation?, Kluwer Academic Publishers, 1999.

 'Validity', pp. 183–206 of A.Varzi (ed.) The Nature of Logic, CSLI Publications, 1999. (European Review of Philosophy, vol. 4). An abbreviated version under the same title appears as pp. 18–25 of The Logica Yearbook, 1997, ed. T.Childers, Institute of Philosophy, Czech Republic.

 ‘Worlds Apart', Mind! 2000 (a supplement to Mind 109 (2000)), 25–31.

 'Motivations for Paraconsistency: the Slippery Slope from Classical Logic to Dialetheism', in D.Batens et al. (eds.), Frontiers of Paraconsistent Logic, Research Studies Press, 2000.

 Logic: One or Many’ in J. Woods, and B. Brown (eds.),  pp. 23–28 of Logical Consequence: Rival Approaches Proceedings of the 1999 Conference of the Society of  Exact Philosophy, Stanmore: Hermes, 2001.
 'Heidegger and the Grammar of Being’, ch. 10 of R.Gaskin (ed.), Grammar in Early 20th Century Philosophy, Routledge, 2001.
 ‘Why it’s Irrational to Believe in Consistency’, pp. 284–93 of Rationality and Irrationality; Proc. 23rd International Wittgenstein Symposium, eds., B.Brogard and B.Smith, 2001.
 'Paraconsistent Logic', Handbook of Philosophical Logic, Vol. 6, pp. 287 – 393, eds. D.Gabbay and F. Guenthner, 2nd edition, Kluwer Academic Publishers, 2002.
 'Inconsistency  and  the  Empirical  Sciences', in J. Meheus (ed.), Inconsistency in Science, Kluwer Academic Publishers, 2002.
 ‘Logicians Setting Together Contradictories. A Perspective on Relevance, Paraconsistency, and Dialetheism’, ch. 14 of  D.Jacquette (ed.), A Companion to Philosophical Logic, Blackwell, 2002.
 ‘Fuzzy Relevant Logic’, Paraconsistency: the Logical Way to the Inconsistent, ed. W.Carnielli et al., Marcel Dekker, 2002.

 ‘Geometries and Arithmetics’, pp. 65–78 of  P.Weingartner (ed.), Alternative Logics;   Do Sciences Need Them?, Springer Verlag, 2003.
 A Site for Sorites', pp. 9–23 of J. C. Beall (ed.),  Liars and Heaps: New Essays on Paradox, Oxford University Press, 2003.
  'Inconsistent Arithmetic: Issues Technical and Philosophical', pp. 273–99 of V. F. Hendricks and J. Malinowski (eds.), Trends in Logic: 50 Years of  Studia Logica (Studia Logica Library, Vol. 21),  Kluwer Academic Publishers, 2003.
 'Nagarjuna and the Limits of  Thought’ (with Jay Garfield), Philosophy East West 53 (2003), 1–21.  Reprinted as ch. 5 of J. Garfield, Empty Words, Oxford University Press, 2002.
 'Consistency, Paraconsistency and the Logical Limitative Theorems', in Grenzen und Grenzüberschreitungen (XIX Deutscher Kongress für Philosophie), ed. W. Hogrebe and J. Bromond, Akademie Verlag, 2004.

 'Spiking the Field Artillery', in J. C. Beall and B. Armour-Garb (eds.), ch. 3 of Truth and Deflationism, Oxford University Press, 2005.

 'The Limits of Language' in K. Brown (ed.), Encyclopedia of Language and Linguistics, (second edition) Vol.7, 156–9, Elsevier, 2005.

 
 'The Paradoxes of Denotation', ch. 7 of Self-Reference, eds. T. Bolander, V. F. Hendrix, and S. A Pedersen, CLSI Lecture Notes, Stanford University, 2006.
 ‘Logic, Paraconsistent’, in D. Borchert (ed.), Encyclopedia of Philosophy (second edition), Macmillan, 2006, Vol. 7, 105–6.
 ‘Logic, Relevant (Relevance)’, in D. Borchert (ed.), Encyclopedia of Philosophy (second edition), Macmillan, 2006, Vol. 8, 358–9.
 'Motion', in D. Borchert (ed.), Encyclopedia of Philosophy (second edition), Macmillan, 2006, Vol. 6, 409–11.

 'Paraconsistency and Dialetheism', pp. 129–204 of Handbook of the History of Logic, Vol. 8, eds. D. Gabbay and J. Woods, North Holland, 2007.
 'Reply to Slater', pp. 467–74 of J-Y Beziau, W. Carnielli and D. Gabbay (eds.), Handbook of Paraconsistency, College Publications, 2007.

 ‘Revenge, Field, and ZF’, ch. 9 of JC Beall (ed.), Revenge of the Liar: New Essays on the Paradox, Oxford University Press, 2007.

 'Envelops and Indifference', (with Greg Restall), pages 283–290 in Dialogues, Logics and Other Strange Things, essays in honour of Shahid Rahman, edited by Cédric Dégremont, Laurent Keiff and Helge Rückert, College Publications, 2008. 
  'Conditionals: a Debate with Jackson', ch.  13 of I. Ravenscroft (ed.),  Minds, Worlds and Conditionals: Themes from the Philosophy of Frank Jackson. Oxford University Press, 2009.
  ‘Beyond the Limits of Knowledge’, ch. 7 (pp. 93–104) of J. Salerno (ed.), New Essays on the Knowability Paradox, Oxford University Press, 2009.

 'Mountains are Just Mountains' (with Jay Garfield), pp. 71–82 of J. Garfield and M. D’Amato (eds.), Pointing at the Moon: Buddhism. Logic and Analytic Philosophy, Oxford University Press, 2009.

  Translation of 'Objects of Thought' into Japanese, in Human Ontology 15 (2009), 1–12. (Trans. S. Yamahguchi.)

 'Not to Be', ch. 23 of R. Le Poidevin, P. Simons, A. McGonical, and R. Cameron (eds.), The Routledge Companion to Metaphysics, Routledge 2009.

 'A Case of Mistaken Identity’, ch. 11, pp. 205–222 of J. Lear and A. Oliver, The Force of Argument, Routledge, 2010.

 ‘Two Truths: Two Models’, to appear in the Cowherds (eds.), Moonshadows, Oxford University Press.
 ‘The Truth(s) about the Two Truths’, (with T.Tilemans and M. Siderits) to appear in the Cowherds (eds.), Moonshadows, Oxford University Press (2010).

Priest
Priest